Lindy Webster Cayzer CF (born 25 April 1952) is an Australian botanist.

 (The Australian Plant Name Index consistently gives her author abbreviation as L.Cayzer.)

Early life and education
Cayzer was born on 25 April 1952, daughter of Robert and Rita Webster. She graduated from the Australian National University with a PhD in 1997.

Career
Cayzer was awarded a Churchill Fellowship in 2016 which enabled her to visit herbaria in Europe and South-East Asia to study the taxonomic data held on the Australian plant family Pittosporaceae. She was supported in this by her husband, Robin Cayzer.

She has continued to work on Australian plants, publishing further work on Pittosporaceae,  a monograph on Gastrolobium,  and more recently, a monograph on Daviesia,  and work on insect pests in timber.

Publications

See also
:Category:Taxa named by Lindy W. Cayzer

References

1952 births
Living people
20th-century Australian botanists
Australian National University alumni
21st-century Australian botanists
20th-century Australian women scientists